The National Alfonsinist Movement (MNA) is a political movement in Argentina with a radical Alfonsinist ideology, founded in 2014 by Leopoldo Moreau a former member of the Radical Civic Union, Gustavo López (leader of the FORJA Concertación Party) and Leandro Santoro (of the Los Irrompibles group), who formed as part of the Front for Victory in 2015, Citizen's Unity in 2017 and the present-day ruling Frente de Todos since 2019. It integrates the political field of Kirchnerism.

History 
In 2014 the MNA split from the Radical Civic Union (UCR) and joined the Front for Victory. This rupture of the UCR materialized through a three-day congress held in Parque Norte in the City of Buenos Aires. In March 2015, Ernesto Sanz, the president of the UCR, announced the expulsion of Moreau from the party.

In 2017, the MNA was part of the founding parties of the Citizen Unity alliance  to compete in the 2017 legislative elections.

Electoral performance

Chamber of Deputies

References 

Political parties established in 2014
2014 establishments in Argentina
Center-left parties in Argentina
Kirchnerism
Radical Civic Union